The PBA Fiesta Conference was a former tournament held during a Philippine Basketball Association season. Each PBA team was allowed to hire a single foreign player, with maximum height limitations set by the league, to play for the said tournament.

History
Prior to the formation of the said conference, the league had two import-laced conferences known as the PBA Commissioner's Cup (with an import height-limit of ), and the PBA Governor's Cup (with an import height-limit of ). However, in 2003, the two conferences were scrapped and was replaced with an Invitational tournament, with an All-Filipino local squad along with foreign teams) and an import-laced Reinforced Conference.

But, in 2004, the league changed its calendar from a calendar year to a fiscal year. As a preparation for the new format, the tournament was institutionalized in 2004 as a transitional tournament. The first Fiesta Conference was played from February–July 2004, which was won by the Barangay Ginebra Kings.

In 2005, the league billed the Reinforced Conference as the Fiesta Conference, with a new rule of allowing teams to allow imports with unlimited height limit. The San Miguel Beermen defeated the Talk N' Text Phone Pals to win the title.

Red Bull Barako won the third edition of the Fiesta Cup, defeating the Purefoods Chunkee Giants in six games.

For the 2006-07 PBA season, the league is moved the Fiesta Conference to March, while putting the Philippine Cup as its opening tournament (October) for the said season.

For the 2008 Fiesta Conference, all teams were allowed to field in imports without height restrictions with the two worst teams on the previous conference having another import but with a  height restriction.

For the 2009 Fiesta Conference, the  height limit was reinstated again.

After the re-adaption of the three conference format starting the 2010-11 season, the tournament was retired to make way for the returning conferences, the Commissioner's and Governors Cup.

Fiesta Conference Finals results

Most Championships

By team 
Barangay Ginebra (2)
San Miguel (2)
Alaska (2)
Red Bull (1)

By coaches 

 Jong Uichico (2)
 Siot Tanquingcen (2)
 Tim Cone (2)
 Yeng Guiao (1)

Individual awards

References

External links
 Official website

 
Recurring sporting events established in 2004
Recurring sporting events disestablished in 2010
2004 establishments in the Philippines
2010 disestablishments in the Philippines